José Ponciano Arriaga Mejía (1811–1865) was a lawyer and radical liberal politician from the Mexican state of San Luis Potosí.

Biography
Arriaga rose to prominence in the late 1840s and is particularly known for pushing for the equality of people through property rights. Arriaga proposed a law in which the government would confiscate lands from the local hacienda owners and redistribute it to the local Indian population. Later in his career, Arriaga proposed landowners who possessed more than 15 square leagues, had to begin cultivating their land or forfeit it. Arriaga further proposed that anyone who did not own at least 50 pesos worth of land would be exempt from most taxes. The focus for Arriaga on equality through property rights stems from his argument that "despite the fundamental laws of the land, a privileged caste would be able to establish an aristocracy of wealth and monopolize land and political power."

Arriaga is also known for proposing a law that would establish a public attorney to represent the poor.

Ponciano Arriaga has served in multiple political positions including:
Minister of justice
Constitutional Congressman representing eight constituencies: Guerrero, Mexico State, Michoacán, Jalisco, Puebla, Zacatecas as well as San Luis Potosí and the Federal District.
Secretary of the Interior
Defensor de los Fondos de Beneficencia
President of the Chamber of Deputies in 1856 and 1862-1863.

Arriaga, in his position as First Minister of the Interior, participated in writing the first draft of the 1857 Mexican constitution, later earning him the title of "Father of the 1857 constitution."

The Ponciano Arriaga International Airport in San Luis Potosí is dedicated to Arriaga's memory. Arriaga is entombed in the Mexican National Rotunda (Rotonda de los Hombres Ilustres).

References

1811 births
1865 deaths
Liberalism in Mexico
Presidents of the Chamber of Deputies (Mexico)
Members of the Chamber of Deputies (Mexico)
19th-century Mexican lawyers
Mexican Secretaries of the Interior
People from San Luis Potosí City
Mexican people of Basque descent
19th-century Mexican politicians
Politicians from San Luis Potosí